Acacia rhodophloia, commonly known as minni ritchi or western red mulga, is a tree or shrub belonging to the genus Acacia and the subgenus Juliflorae that is endemic to a large area of arid central western Australia. The Indigenous group the Kurrama peoples know the plant as mantaru.

Description
It usually has a few main stems that are sparingly divided around ground level with the upper branches forming a usually horizontally spreading crown on mature plants. The multi-stemmed juvenile plants are more likely to have a rounded habit. The main stems and limbs have attractive red Minni ritchi style bark that curl back onto themselves into small scrolls. It has glabrous branchlets that can have indumentum covered in dried resin at the angled extremities. Like many species of Acacia it has phyllodes rather than true leaves. The ascending to erect, dull green to grey-green phyllodes are straight to shallowly sickle shaped are glabrous or sparsely haired with many fine longitudinal nerves that are very close together with a central nerve than can be more prominent than the others. It blooms sporadically from May to October or at other time following significant rainfall events producing yellow flowers. The shiny dark brown to black coloured seeds within the pods are arranged longitudinally.

Taxonomy
The species was first formally described in 1980 by the botanist Bruce Maslin as part of the work Acacia (Leguminosae-Mimosoideae): A contribution to the flora of central Australia as published in the Journal of the Adelaide Botanic Gardens. It was reclassified as Racosperma rhodophloia by Leslie Pedley in 2003 then transferred back to genus Acacia in 2006. The specific epithet is derived from the Greek words - meaning rose red and  meaning bark referring to the colour of the bark of this species.
It is part of a small and complex group of species including Acacia adsurgens, Acacia kempeana and Acacia sibirica but is easily distinguished by the characteristic bark.

Distribution
It is native to a large area in the Northern Territory and the Pilbara, Goldfields, Mid West and Kimberley regions of Western Australia where it is commonly situated on granite outcrops, sand plains and rocky hills and rises growing in sandy to gravelly soils. The range of the plant extends into the Northern Territory to around the Ehrenberg Range in the east and to Docker Creek and Bloods Range in the south with one population being recorded in South Australia to the north of Tarcoola It is known to grow in rocky areas in red-brown loamy to loamy clay soils usually as a part of Mulga communities where it can form small nearly pure stands but is also associated with scrub heath, Casuarina scrub communities or commonly found along with spinifex.

See also
List of Acacia species

References

rhodophloia
Acacias of Western Australia
Flora of the Northern Territory
Plants described in 1980
Taxa named by Bruce Maslin